Informatics Philippines (currently doing business as Informatics College and Informatics Institute) is a multinational corporation that provides Information and Communications Technology training and education established in 1993 in the Philippines. It offers corporate productivity, business solutions and higher education from undergraduate to corporate/short courses completions. It also offers diploma courses. As of academic year 2016-2017, the institution offers senior high school in compliance with K-12. 

Over the years, Informatics Philippines has managed to forge partnerships with various universities internationally. To date, Informatics Philippines have affiliations of 20 universities across United States, United Kingdom, Australia and New Zealand such as University of Wales, Northumbria University, Oxford Brookes University, University of West London, University of Southern Queensland, and University of Portsmouth.

Informatics Philippines is part of the network of the Informatics Group based in Singapore.

Branches and campuses

As of late 2021, Informatics has 6 centers operating nationwide. Student population mainly determine the longevity of the campuses.

Luzon and National Capital Region
Manila Area
Manila – Informatics College
South NCR
Northgate-Alabang – Informatics College
North Luzon
Baguio – Informatics Institute
South Luzon
Imus, Cavite – Informatics College

Visayas / Mindanao
Cagayan de Oro, Northern Mindanao – Informatics College
Consolacion, Cebu – Informatics College

Informatics Group

The Informatics Group, listed on the mainboard of the Stock Exchange of Singapore, was established in 1983, and is a multinational corporation providing services in information technology and business management.

The Informatics Group is a global network of training and education companies that operates in over 50 countries spanning Asia, Europe, Africa and South America. Aside from Informatics Philippines, these networks include NCC Education, Informatics Singapore, Informatics Global Campus (Online Learning), Informatics Hong Kong, and Informatics Sri Lanka. It presently offers programmes from Ordinary and Advanced (O/A) Levels (for international students) to undergraduate and post-graduate degree completions.

References

An Informatics Philippines-related article featured at The Philippine Star Lifestyle – 1
An Informatics Philippines-related article featured at The Philippine Star Lifestyle – 2

External links
Informatics Philippines official website
Informatics Education (Informatics Group) official website

Educational institutions established in 1993
Universities and colleges in the Philippines
1993 establishments in the Philippines
Information technology schools
Information technology institutes